A triolet is almost always a stanza poem of eight lines, though stanzas with as few as seven lines and as many as nine or more have appeared in its history.  Its rhyme scheme is ABaAabAB (capital letters represent lines repeated verbatim) and often in 19th century English triolets all lines are in iambic tetrameter, though in traditional French triolets, from the 17th century on, the second, sixth and eighth lines tend to be iambic trimeters followed by one amphibrachic foot each. In French terminology, a line ending in an iambic foot was denoted as masculine, while a line ending in an amphibrachic foot was called feminine. Depending on the language and era, other meters are seen, even in French. The first, fourth and seventh lines are identical, as are the second and final lines, thereby making the initial and final couplets identical as well. In a traditional French triolet, the second and third non-repeating lines rhyme with the repeating first, fourth, and seventh lines, while the non-repeating sixth line rhymes with the second and eighth repeating lines. However, especially in German triolets of the 18th and 19th centuries, one will see this pattern often violated.

History

The triolet is a close cousin of the rondeau, the rondel, and the rondelet, other French verse forms emphasizing repetition and rhyme. The form stems from medieval French poetry and seems to have had its origin in Picardy.

The earliest written examples are from the late 13th century. In this century, possibly the earliest surviving triolet is from "Li Roumans dou Chastelain de Couci et de la Dame de Fayel", where it is referred to as simply a song ("chanson"). Seven more easily datable 13th century triolets (also known as songs) are to be found in "Cléomadès" by Adenet le Roi. In the early 14th century, the songwriter, Jean Lescurel, wrote many triolets under the term of rondel. Lescurel was followed by Guillaume Machaut and, at the end of the century, by Jean Froissart. In the early 15th century, Christine de Pisan experimented with a slightly abbreviated seven-line variation of the triolet which she, like her predecessors, also termed a rondel. Toward the end of this century, Dutch language triolets (though designated as rondels) by Anthonis de Roovere appear. Also, at the end of  the 15th century, the term triolet appears for the first time. It was probably first so designated by Octavien de Saint-Gelais, whose colleague André de la Vigne appears to have designated his own triolets as rondelets. In the 16th century, variously designated French and Dutch triolets continue to appear, though they largely lose favor by the end of the century. In the 17th century from 1648 to 1652, triolets designated as triolets became suddenly popular in France during the civil uprisings of the "Fronde" when triolets were used for propaganda purposes and for character assassination. However, what remains easily accessible from this period are, basically, two poems, one by Marc-Antoine Girard, Sieur de Saint-Amant and another by Jacques de Ranchin. Saint-Amant's poem is a triolet about writing a triolet and Ranchin's, also known as the "king of triolets", is about falling in love on the first of May. Though the triolet did not recover its former popularity in 18th  century France, it did, with the appearance of Théodore de Banville in the mid-19th century, experience a revival of interest with triolets being written by Arthur Rimbaud, Maurice Rollinat, Alphonse Daudet, and Stéphane Mallarmé.

The earliest known triolets composed in English were written in 1651 by Patrick Cary, briefly a Benedictine at Douai, who purportedly used them in his devotions. None of Cary's poetry was published until the late 18th century and his triolets did not achieve notice until Sir Walter Scott published them in 1820.  Probably, the two earliest publications of a triolet in English were both translations of Ranchin's king of triolets,  with one being published in 1728 and the other in 1806. In 1835 a rondel of Froissart was translated into English as a triolet. In 1870 Robert Bridges became the first English poet to write original triolets in English that were published and achieved recognition in England. This, though, was less through his own efforts than through the impact of an influential article written by Edmund Gosse and printed in 1877 in the Cornhill Magazine reintroducing the triolet to the English public at large, among whom it enjoyed a brief popularity among late-nineteenth-century British poets.

Not only did the triolet come to enjoy popularity in the late 19th century among English writers, but in the 18th and 19th centuries, it also came to enjoy a certain popularity among writers other European languages. Among the various languages in which the triolet appeared, German writers of triolets, in particular, were not only numerous, but, by and large, made a point of developing it in new directions not seen with English and French writers. In addition to German, the triolet also appeared in Dutch, Greek, Hungarian, Polish, Portuguese, Russian, Spanish, and possibly other languages during these two centuries. Moreover, in Brazil in the late 19th century, the triolet spawned a new, somewhat abbreviated, six-line verse form known as the biolet.

Though possessing a long history, triolets, with the exception of France in the years from 1648 to 1652, have always been a relatively rare verse form. Nevertheless, the number of languages in which triolets have been written and the number of poets who have written triolets has steadily increased and it seems to be exhibiting a new vitality with the advent of the 21st century.

Examples
The following five triolets were written in 1651, 1806, 1870, 1877 and 1888, respectively, the first four being written by Englishmen and the last by an American.

The French example referred to above[which one?], by Ranchin in c. 1690, was described by Edmund Gosse as "No more typical specimen of the [early French] triolet could be found":

The modern English triolet
The following is an example of a modern English triolet.

In the last line the punctuation is altered; this is common although not strictly in keeping with the original form. Furthermore, the fact that the "berries now are gone" has a new relevance, the birds are going unfed, creates a new significance from the line repetition.

References

Further reading
 
Hikaru Kitabayashi: The Tower of Babel, A Trioletic Anthology from Various Languages, Lulu Press Inc., 2017.  
Hikaru Kitabayashi: A Geolinguistic Chronicle of Early Triolet Dispersal in Western European Languages, Lulu Press Inc., 2017.  
A. Preminger, C. Scott, J. Kane: Triolet. In: Roland Greene, Stephen Cushman et al. (Hrsg.): The Princeton Encyclopedia of Poetry and Poetics. 4th edition. Princeton University Press 2012.

External links
How Great My Grief by Thomas Hardy
Triolet on a Line Apocryphally Attributed to Martin Luther by A. E. Stallings
The Country Wife (a double triolet) by Dana Gioia
Valentine by Wendy Cope
Gilda & Johnny, a triolet sequence by Antonia Clark
The Triolet by Don Marquis
Examples of Triolet
Triolet Workshop
Sentimental Triolet by Valerian Gaprindashvili in Georgian and parallel English translation with video
Japanese Triolets by Qbu, transcribed using the Latin alphabet and appearing with an English translation.
How to Write a Triolet (with Examples) by Carol Smallwood

Western medieval lyric forms
Stanzaic form